Virgin Broadband may refer to services of:

 Virgin Mobile Australia
 Virgin Media (UK)